Asim Shah is a Nepalese politician, director, producer belonging to the Rastriya Swatantra Party. He is currently serving as the member of the 2nd Federal Parliament of Nepal. In the 2022 Nepalese general election he was elected as a proportional representative from the Nepalese Muslims category. 

His filmography consist of Karkash (2013) and Dui Rupaiya (2017). He has predominantly worked in many television commercials. His brother Asif Shah is a Nepali film actor, producer and TV presenter.

References

Living people
Nepal MPs 2022–present
Year of birth missing (living people)